Retinol dehydrogenase 14 is an enzyme that in humans is encoded by the RDH14 gene.

References

Further reading